Kate Wheeler (born 1955 Oklahoma) is an American novelist and meditation teacher. Since 2016, she has served as the coordinator of the Meditation Retreat Teacher Training Program at the Spirit Rock Meditation Center in Woodacre, California, where she trains senior students to be empowered as teachers. She also is a practicing Buddhist teacher and instructor that offers retreats, talks, and person guidance to communities and individuals. Wheller received a Pushcart Prize as well as two O. Henry Awards.

Life
She was raised in various parts of South America.  She graduated from Rice University, and Stanford University.  She was ordained a Buddhist nun in Burma. She teaches at Southwest Texas State University. She was a panelist at the Key West Literary Seminar.

She is married and lives in Somerville, Massachusetts.

Awards
 1981 Second prize, Xerox-Atlantic Monthly American Short Story Contest
 1982 O. Henry Awards, for La Victoire
 1983 Pushcart Prize, for Judgment
 1992 The Best American Short Stories 1992
 1993 O. Henry Awards, for Improving My Average
 1993 PEN/Faulkner runner-up
 1994 Whiting Award
 1994 NEA Fellowship
 1996 Twenty best novelists under 40 in US, Granta
 1997 Best of Outside: the First 20 Years
 1998 Guggenheim Fellowship
 1999 Somerville Arts Council Grant
 2002 Best American Travel Writing
 2008 Best Women's Travel Writing
 2008 The Best Buddhist Writing
 2008 Radcliffe Institute Fellow

Works

Editors

Anthologies
"Contemporary Fiction: Granta's Best of the Young American Novelists " 1996

References

External links
Personal web page
Profile at The Whiting Foundation

20th-century American novelists
21st-century American novelists
American women novelists
Buddhist writers
1955 births
American Buddhist nuns
Living people
Novelists from Oklahoma
Rice University alumni
Stanford University alumni
National Endowment for the Arts Fellows
20th-century American women writers
21st-century American women writers
PEN/Faulkner Award for Fiction winners
20th-century Buddhist nuns